Mollison may refer to:

Bill Mollison (1928–2016), researcher, author, scientist, teacher and naturalist
Clifford Mollison (1897–1986), British film and television actor
Deborah Mollison (born 1958), British composer and songwriter
Derek Mollison (1901–1943), Australian footballer and businessman
Fiona Mollison (born 1954), British television and theatre actress
Henry Mollison (1905–1985), British film actor
James Mollison, AO, (1931–2020), director of the National Gallery of Australia
James William Mollison (1858–1927), British agriculture specialist in India
Jim Mollison (1905–1959), Scottish pioneer aviator who set many records
Sam Mollison, electronic music producer and vocalist
William Loudon Mollison (1851–1929), Scottish mathematician and academic

English-language surnames
Scottish surnames
Surnames of Lowland Scottish origin